Entertainment Is Over If You Want It is the first LP from the band The Swords Project (now named simply Swords), but the second release from the group.

Track listing
"01." – 1:30
"City Life"  – 4:18
"MD11" – 5:41
"Cocktails & Shuttlecocks" – 6:13
"Audience of One" – 10:15
"Immigracion" – 4:35
"New Shapes" – 9:31

References

External links
Arena Rock Recording Co.

Swords (band) albums
2003 albums
Arena Rock Recording Company albums